Heliodorus of Bet Zabdai (died 344) was a Syrian bishop of Bet Zabdai in Mesopotamia and a martyr.

He was taken to Persia as a prisoner of war by Shapur II. He died as a result of ill treatment and fatigue at Daskarata on the Great Zab, in 344. He is commemorated with a feast day on August 20.

References
Holweck, F. G. A Biographical Dictionary of the Saints. St. Louis, MO: B. Herder Book Co., 1924.

Year of birth missing
344 deaths
4th-century Mesopotamian bishops
4th-century Christian saints